Anne Canal is a artificial lake in Tartu, Estonia.

References

Tartu
Lakes of Tartu County